The Redback on the Toilet Seat can refer to:

The Redback on the Toilet Seat, a 1972 country music EP by Slim Newton
The Redback on the Toilet Seat (LP), a 1972 country music LP by Slim Newton
"The Redback on the Toilet Seat", an award winning country music song by Slim Newton recorded in 1971

See also
Redback on the Toilet Seat, a 2008 book of Slim Newton's lyrics illustrated by Craig Smith